Elliot Knight is an English actor. He made his acting debut as the title character on the Sky1 action-adventure series Sinbad (2012). Continuing to work on television, Knight appeared as a series regular on the BBC One crime drama By Any Means (2013), the CBS mystery American Gothic, and The CW comedy-drama Life Sentence (2018), in addition to portraying Merlin on the ABC fantasy Once Upon a Time (2015) and Don Hall / Dove on the DC Universe / HBO Max superhero drama Titans (2018; 2021). On film, he appeared in the science fiction horror Color Out of Space (2020). Knight also portrayed Sergeant Kyle "Gaz" Garrick in the first-person shooters' Call of Duty: Modern Warfare (2019), and Call of Duty: Modern Warfare II (2022).

Early life and education
Knight was born in Birmingham, United Kingdom to Stuart and Lorna Knight, who are both teachers. His father works at Broadway Secondary School in Perry Barr, Birmingham. He was a pupil at King Edward VI Aston School and studied subsequently at the Manchester Metropolitan School of Theatre, where he graduated with a BA (Hon) degree in 2011.

Career
In June 2011, Sky1 announced that Knight had won the lead role in the television drama Sinbad which was his first professional role. The series premiered in July 2012. In 2013, Knight joined the cast of BBC crime drama By Any Means. In 2015, Knight was cast to play Merlin in the fifth season of Once Upon a Time.

In March 2017, Knight was cast as Wes Charles in The CW series Life Sentence. The series was picked up in May for a midseason premiere some time in 2018.

In 2020, Knight starred opposite Nicolas Cage and Joely Richardson in the sci-fi cosmic horror film Color Out of Space, directed by Richard Stanley.

In 2021, Knight was cast as Officer Chadwick in season 5 of the TNT crime drama Animal Kingdom.

Personal life
Knight is openly queer.

Filmography

References

External links

 
 Elliot Knight at Payne Management

Living people
Alumni of Manchester Metropolitan University
Black British male actors
English LGBT actors
English male television actors
English people of Nigerian descent
LGBT Black British people
Male actors from the West Midlands (county)
People from West Bromwich
Queer actors
Year of birth missing (living people)